Sailom Adi (also known as Saylom Ardee, born 7 July 1986 at Ban Phai District, Khon Kaen Province) is a Thai amateur boxer who competed at featherweight at the 2008 Olympics and at lightweight at the 2012 London Olympics. He got Master of Social Sciences from Thongsook College.

At the 2008 Summer Olympics, he had a bye through to the second round and then lost to Abdelkader Chadi of Algeria.

At the 2012 Olympics he controversially lost his first bout against Gani Zhailauov 12:12 on countback.

References

External links
 
 
 

1986 births
Living people
Sailom Adi
Sailom Adi
Featherweight boxers
Sailom Adi
Boxers at the 2008 Summer Olympics
Boxers at the 2012 Summer Olympics
Boxers at the 2016 Summer Olympics
Sailom Adi
Asian Games medalists in boxing
Boxers at the 2006 Asian Games
Boxers at the 2010 Asian Games
Boxers at the 2014 Asian Games
Boxers at the 2018 Asian Games
Medalists at the 2018 Asian Games
Sailom Adi
Sailom Adi
Southeast Asian Games medalists in boxing
Competitors at the 2007 Southeast Asian Games
Competitors at the 2009 Southeast Asian Games
Competitors at the 2011 Southeast Asian Games
Competitors at the 2015 Southeast Asian Games